A non-binding referendum on resolving the Beagle conflict was held in Argentina on 25 November 1984. Voters were asked whether they approved of the government's negotiated settlement with Chile, which would result in Argentina recognising the Picton, Lennox and Nueva islands as being Chilean territory. Although the plebiscite was not binding,  President Raul Alfonsin declared that he would respect the outcome of the vote. The proposal was approved by 82.6% of voters, with a turnout of 70%.

Background
The ruling party, the Radical Civic Union, called for a vote in favor of the settlement. The opposition, headed by the Justicialist Party, boycotted the process, claiming that it distracted from economic problems. Some opponents, including Herminio Iglesias, called for voters to participate in the referendum and vote against. In contrast, other leaders like Carlos Menem came out in favour of the settlement. The right-wing, including military groups that ruled Argentina between 1976 and 1983, were also against the settlement.

Results

By province

Aftermath
Despite the overwhelming support from voters, the Argentine National Congress only approved the treaty on 14 March 1985 by a vote of 23–22, with one abstention.

References

Argentina
1984 in Argentina
Referendums in Argentina
Presidency of Raúl Alfonsín
November 1984 events in South America